Kuopio Market Square is the market square in the Multimäki district in Kuopio, North Savonia, Finland. The market is located about one hundred meters above sea level and the size of the area is 130×174 meters. The cover is made of dice and nubile stone. In the east–west direction, the area is crossed by flat walkways. As a surface, the market is slightly sloping, which poses challenges for use. The structure rests on a 10–15 m deep sand mattress, under which there is a ridge formation starting from Väinölänniemi, which runs under the church towards Puijo. Tulliportinkatu runs along the edges of the square in the north, Puijonkatu in the east, Kauppakatu in the south and Haapaniemenkatu in the west.

The locals use the nickname Mualiman napa in the square, which more freely translates to mean either "the pole of the world" or "the navel of the world".

History 
In 1775, surveyor Pehr Kjellman was commissioned to draw up a town plan for the city after King Gustav III had designated the then Kuopio's church village as the capital of the Savonia and Karelia provinces, which he had founded in the same year. Already the following year the formula was ready, and the king approved it immediately. The center of Kjellman's town plan was the Great Market, which was named the Gustav Market (Kustaantori) a few years later after the city's founder. Earlier than this, the market square founded by Per Brahe the Younger was located in the town plan on the shores of what is now Kuopio Bay. That is why the area is now called Brahe Park (Brahenpuisto) and the edge of the park runs through Brahenkatu. In its current location, the market has been located in its current location since 1818. It became a market square in 1856, when the market store moved to this location from the site of the former Gustav Market, now Snellman Park (Snellmaninpuisto), named after J. V. Snellman.

See also 
 List of city squares

Other notable places in Kuopio 
 Kauppakatu
 Kuopio City Hall
 Kuopio Market Hall
 Lake Kallavesi
 Puijo Hill

Notes

References

External links 

Kuopion kaupunkikeskustan kehittämisyhdistys ry (in Finnish)
Pohjois-Savon muisti: Askeleita Kuopiossa (in Finnish)
Radio Savon sivukokonaisuus "Kuopion alatori" (in Finnish)

Kuopio
Retail markets in Finland